Kauru is a Local Government Area in southern Kaduna State, Nigeria. The area is 3,186 km. Its headquarters are in the town of Kauru. 
The postal code of the area is 811.

Boundaries
Kauru Local Government Area shares boundaries with Zangon Kataf Local Government Area to the southwest, Kajuru, Igabi and Soba Local Government Areas to the northwest, Kubau Local Government Area to the north, Lere Local Government Area to the northeast, Kaura Local Government Area to the south and Plateau State to southeast, respectively.

Administrative subdivisions
Kauru Local Government Area consists of 11 subdivisions (second-order administrative divisions), namely:
 Badurum
 Bital
 Damakasuwa
 Dawaki
 Geshere
 Kamaru
 Kauru East
 Kauru West
 Kwassam
 Makami
 Pari

Population
Kauru Local Government Area has an area of 2,810 km, with a population density of 106.3/km [2016] and annual population change of +3.05%/year. Its population was recorded to be 221,276, based on the March 21, 2006 census records. In terms of gender count, 111,119 was recorded for males and 110,157 for females. Its population was projected by the National Population Commission of Nigeria and National Bureau of Statistics to be 298,700 by March 21, 2016.

People
Kauru Local Government Area consists of a number of ethnic groups and subgroups such as: [Rumaya/Ammala language] Abin, Abishi, Akurmi, Anu, Atsam, Avori, Irigwe, Kaivi, Koonu, Ngmgbang. Others are: Atyap, Hausa, Igbo.

References

External links

Local Government Areas in Kaduna State